Nelson Abelardo Solórzano Aponte (born 30 May 1959 in Caracas) is a Venezuelan former basketball player and current basketball coach.

National team career
Solórzano competed as a player in the 1992 Summer Olympics with the senior men's Venezuelan national basketball team.

Coaching career
Solórzano has worked as an assistant coach with the senior men's Venezuelan national basketball team. He was an assistant coach with Venezuela at the 2016 Summer Olympics.

He was hired as head coach of the Cocodrilos de Caracas of the Venezuelan Liga Profesional de Baloncesto in 2019. He had previously coached Toros de Aragua, Marinos de Anzoátegui, Panteras de Miranda and Gigantes de Guayana.

References

1959 births
Living people
Venezuelan basketball coaches
Venezuelan men's basketball players
1990 FIBA World Championship players
Olympic basketball players of Venezuela
Basketball players at the 1992 Summer Olympics
Sportspeople from Caracas